Sulpicia (c. 69 – 14 BC) was the wife of Lucius Cornelius Lentulus Cruscellio.  Lentulus was the son of Lucius Cornelius Lentulus Crus.

Sulpicia's mother was Tullia ("Julia") Caesaris (c. 86 – 34 BC) and her father was Servius Sulpicius Rufus (c. 106 – 43 BC).

Life
Sulpicia's story is much like Curia's. Her husband was also a legally condemned outlaw and proscribed by the triumvirs in the same year of 43 BC. He fled from Rome secretly and went to join the military of Sextus Pompeius in Sicily. Once she knew where he was safely, then she joined him. This was not an easy task however. Her mother, with whom she had a close relationship, was keeping a very close eye on her so she would not go to her husband in exile. Sulpicia however came up with a ruse and dressed like a little slave girl. She then took two other little slave girls and two slave boys with her and escaped from her mother's watchful eyes. She was not afraid of being persecuted and was very dedicated to her husband. She was willing to risk her life for his love. Upon arriving in Sicily, she soon learned where Lentulus was. He was supposed to be a praetor but his attitude did not reflect this. He was found in the gutter with unkempt hair eating rotten food mourning for his lovely wife.

References

Primary sources
Appian, The Civil Wars Book four [39]
Valerius Maximus, Memorable Deeds and Sayings 6.7.1-3.

Secondary sources
Dictionary of Greek and Roman Biography and Mythology page 733 (v. 2)  
Dictionary of Greek and Roman Biography and Mythology, page 943 (v. 3)
The Education of a Christian Woman: A Sixteenth-Century Manual By Juan Luis Vives, pp. 187, 338, 342; University of Chicago Press (2000); 

60s BC births
14 BC deaths
1st-century BC Romans
1st-century BC Roman women
Sulpicii

Year of birth uncertain